The Måbødalen bus accident or Måbø Canyon bus accident  was a bus crash on 15 August 1988 during the descent from Hardangervidda into the Måbø Valley on the way to Bergen, Norway. The bus collided with the concrete arch at the exit of the Måbø Tunnel on Norwegian National Road 7. Of the 34 passengers aboard, 15 were killed. In addition, the bus driver died from his injuries 12 days after the crash.

Accident 
The bus was a Volvo B58 built in 1977 and owned by the Swedish company "All the Way". It had been chartered for a school trip, carrying fifth graders from Kista in Sweden to Bergen, where they were scheduled to continue to Shetland.

Twelve of the passengers who died were children, while three were parents. The 44-year-old driver, Kent Sören Byström, was recovered alive from the wreck and was able to testify to investigators, but he succumbed from his injuries on August 27 at a hospital in Stockholm. 

The tragedy was deeply felt in Norway and Sweden.

Investigation
Police investigations concluded that no person could be held accountable for the accident.
The main cause of the crash was determined to be faulty brakes on the bus. Only two of the four wheels had brakes, and an auxiliary electric brake was not functioning. The heavy use of the braking system caused it to gradually overheat, finally failing completely. An attempt from the driver to switch to a lower gear failed, and left the wheels entirely decoupled from the engine. Without anything to slow the bus down, the bus gathered speed on the downhill stretch.

Beyond the end of the tunnel is a  cliff, and there was speculation that the driver deliberately steered the bus into the tunnel wall in order to prevent an even worse accident from happening. In his testimony, the driver said he had considered using the wall to slow the bus down, though the investigation showed that there was no contact with the wall before the final crash.

Vehicle brakes frequently overheat along the steep road in the Måbø Valley, with a number of lorries catching fire and at least one fatal truck accident in 1998. Additional causes were the driver's lack of experience in driving in long downhill stretches, and the lack of adequate warning signs along the road.

Aftermath 
The psychological effects on the survivors were studied up to twenty years after the accident, unusually long for an accident of this nature. Several of the survivors, as well as the witnesses who arrived immediately after the disaster, continue to suffer from the traumatic experience.

See also 
Beaune coach crash
Sierre coach crash

References

 Snorre Sklet Summary of major Norwegian disasters. Page 147 
 Måbødal-ulykken 20 år etter (Måbødalen disaster, 20 years later) bt.no, 15 August 2008 

Bus incidents in Norway
1988 in Norway
1988 road incidents
Road transport in Vestland
August 1988 events in Europe